Henri Drouin (December 6, 1911 – March 29, 1992) was a Canadian lawyer, politician, and judge.

Born in L'Annonciation, Quebec, Drouin studied at the Université de Montréal before being called to the Bar of Quebec in 1936. From 1936 to 1950, he was a practising lawyer in Amos, Quebec. From 1950 to 1976 he was a judge of the Superior Court.

He was elected to the Legislative Assembly of Quebec in the riding of Abitibi-Est in 1944. A Liberal, he was defeated in 1948.

References

1911 births
1992 deaths
Judges in Quebec
Lawyers in Quebec
People from Laurentides
Quebec Liberal Party MNAs
20th-century Canadian lawyers